The list of Basque footballers features male association football players from the 'Greater Basque Country', a territory with a population of around 3 million (comprising the Basque autonomous Community (País Vasco or Euskadi) and Navarre which are two of Spain's seventeen autonomous communities, plus the Northern Basque Country, an agglomeration community in France) who have reached international status with the national teams as specified, the vast majority representing Spain.

The region has a representative squad – the Basque Country national football team – but they are not recognised by FIFA, were inactive for long periods and only play friendly matches against FIFA teams or against other sides with similar status such as Catalonia.

Basque Country national team players (since 1990)

Listed below are the players who have featured for the Basque Country international team dating from 1990 when regular fixtures against FIFA national teams were arranged. As of November 2020, there have been 30 matches played in this era (including four against Catalonia and one against Corsica who have the same unofficial status as the Basques and select their squads on the same basis), with 195 players involved.

Notes

FIFA international players from the Basque Country
All of the players listed were either born or raised in the Basque region, with most meeting both of those criteria. 

 Players in bold have won the FIFA World Cup
 Players in underlined have won a continental championships
 Players in italics have won the gold medal at the Olympic Games

Notes

Player representation by each Basque province

Basque heritage
There are many other international footballers with some Basque heritage or connection, for example:

See also
 Basque Football Federation
 List of Basque female footballers
 List of France international footballers
 List of Spain international footballers
 Athletic Bilbao signing policy
 List of Athletic Bilbao players
 List of Real Sociedad players 
 Navarre autonomous football team

References

External links
 Spain national team players (with province of birth) at BDFutbol
 List of all Basque players who have played international football at rsssf.com
 Euskal Selekzioa Online 

List
Basque
footballers
Navarrese footballers
Basque
Association football player non-biographical articles
Basque